Artitropa alaotrana is a species of butterfly in the family Hesperiidae. It is found on Madagascar (the Antsianaka district). The habitat consists of forests.

References

Butterflies described in 1916
Butterflies of Africa
Taxa named by Charles Oberthür